Columbus Clark Cockerham (December 21, 1921 – November 4, 1996) was an American statistical geneticist known for his work in quantitative genetics.

Early life and education
Cockerham was born on December 21, 1921 in Mountain Park, North Carolina. He grew up nearby on his family's farm. He received his B.S. degree in agriculture from the North Carolina State College of Agriculture and Engineering in 1943. After serving in the United States Marine Corps during World War II, he returned to North Carolina State College of Agriculture and Engineering, where he received his M.S. in animal industry in 1949. In 1952, he received his Ph.D. from Iowa State College, where he studied with Jay Lush.

Career
In 1952, Cockerham became an assistant professor of biostatistics at the University of North Carolina at Chapel Hill. The following year, he joined North Carolina State University (NCSU) as an associate professor of statistics. At NCSU, he later became the William Neal Reynolds Professor of Statistics and Genetics and the director of the NIH Project Program in Statistics. In 1963, he successfully persuaded the National Institute of General Medical Sciences to award him a research grant for a program in quantitative genetics, which he directed until his retirement in 1990. During this time, NCSU's quantitative genetics program was the largest project at NCSU that was funded by a federal grant.

Honors and awards
Cockerham was elected a member of the National Academy of Sciences in 1974. He received the North Carolina Award in science in 1976, the O. Max Gardner Award in 1980, and NCSU's Holladay Medal in 1994. He was also a recipient of the Gamma Sigma Delta Award of Merit and a fellow of the American Society of Agronomy.

Personal life and death
Cockerham was married to Joyce Evelyn Allen, with whom he had three children: C. Clark Cockerham Jr., Jean Davis, and Bruce A. Cockerham. C. Clark Cockerham died on November 4, 1996.

References

External links
Profile at SNAC

1921 births
1996 deaths
Members of the United States National Academy of Sciences
North Carolina State University faculty
North Carolina State University alumni
Iowa State University alumni
American geneticists
Statistical geneticists
University of North Carolina at Chapel Hill faculty
People from Surry County, North Carolina
American statisticians
United States Marine Corps personnel of World War II